The 1992 Rhode Island gubernatorial election was held on November 3, 1992. Incumbent Democrat Bruce Sundlun defeated Republican nominee Elizabeth A. Leonard with 61.55% of the vote.

A Democrat would not be elected Governor of Rhode Island again until Gina Raimondo did so in 2014.

Primary elections
Primary elections were held on September 15, 1992.

Democratic primary

Candidates
Bruce Sundlun, incumbent Governor
Francis X. Flaherty, former Mayor of Warwick

Results

Republican primary

Candidates
Elizabeth A. Leonard, businesswoman
J. Michael Levesque, Mayor of West Warwick

Results

General election

Candidates
Major party candidates
Bruce Sundlun, Democratic
Elizabeth A. Leonard, Republican

Other candidates
Joseph F. Devine, Reform
Jack D. Potter, Populist
John J. Staradumsky, Independent

Results

References

1992
Rhode Island
Gubernatorial